Zicuirán-Infiernillo Biosphere Reserve is a biosphere reserve in western Mexico. It covers 2,651.18 km2 of the Sierra Madre del Sur range in the state of Michoacán, west of the Balsas River.

References

Biosphere reserves of Mexico
Protected areas of Michoacán
Sierra Madre del Sur